Mariana Pimentel is a municipality in the state of Rio Grande do Sul, Brazil. It is located approximately 75 km from the state's capital, Porto Alegre.

Geography
Mariana Pimentel belongs to Porto Alegre Metropolitan Mesoregion and to Porto Alegre Microregion.
The municipality can be accessed through RS-711, which is connected to BR-116.

Ecosystem
The outcrop Morro do Papaléo within Mariana Pimentel was the discovery site of two species of the extinct algae Brazilea, dating back to the Sakmarian of the Permian.

See also
List of municipalities in Rio Grande do Sul

References

External links
 Prefecture's website
Department of Tourism of Rio Grande do Sul

Municipalities in Rio Grande do Sul